Tropical Storm Ofelia, known in the Philippines as Tropical Storm Luming, was an early-season tropical cyclone that passed south Japan during July 1993. An area of disturbed weather developed from the Western Pacific monsoon trough in late July 1993. The disturbance organized into a tropical depression on July 24, and the next day developed into a tropical storm. On the next day, the storm made landfall shortly before weakening to a tropical depression. On July 27, Ofelia transitioned into an extratropical cyclone.

Across Tokushima Prefecture, 3 people were killed and 44 homes were damaged while 25 other homes were destroyed. Elsewhere, across Kochi Prefecture, 142 homes were damaged and an additional 452 were destroyed. Three people were also killed and another was injured. The storm dropped heavy rains in Ehime Prefecture for a 36-hour period, resulting in 17 landslides and the cancellation of 16 flights. Throughout the prefecture, 119 houses were damaged and 10 others were destroyed. In Oita Prefecture, a landslide destroyed a home in Honyabakei, killing three. In Hiroshima Prefecture, 18,060 households lost power after 934 power lines were downed while 713 homes were damaged and 54 were destroyed. A total of 22 railtracks and 1,165 roads were damaged. Three people were also hurt. In Yamaguchi Prefecture, four people were killed. Moreover, 1,312 homes were damaged and 84 others were destroyed. Overall, 13 people were killed and damage was estimated at 21.9 billion yen (US$197 million).

Meteorological history

Tropical Storm Ofelia originated from the Western Pacific monsoon trough during July 1993. At 06:00 UTC on July 24, the Joint Typhoon Warning Center (JTWC) started tracking a tropical disturbance, which the Japan Meteorological Agency classified as a tropical depression twelve hours later. Around this time, the Philippine Atmospheric, Geophysical and Astronomical Services Administration (PAGASA) also monitored the storm and assigned it with the local name Luming. At 22:00 UTC, a Tropical Cyclone Formation Alert was issued based on satellite imagery that showed a well-organized system, although the low-level circulation remained exposed from the deep convection. Due to the sudden development of central dense overcast over the low-level circulation center, the JTWC issued its first warning on Tropical Storm Ofelia at 06:00 UTC on July 25, although post-season analysis from the JTWC indicated that Ofelia did not become a tropical storm until three hours later. The JMA followed suit that evening. Tracking west-northwestwards, Ofelia slowly intensified. Overland, the storm weakened to a tropical depression later on July 27. After moving across southern Japan, Ofelia recurved northeastwards and became an extratropical cyclone over the Sea of Japan on July 28. The JTWC ceased tracking the system that morning, with the JTWC doing the same a day later.

Impact

Under the anticipation of landfall over Kyushu, weather alerts were issued for Kyushu and western Honshu, where rains up to  expected. The cyclone, in conjunction with Tropical Storm Nathan before it and Tropical Storm Percy after it, dropped heavy rainfall across southern portions of the Japanese archipelago across late July and early August 1993. A total of  fell in Ebino; this was the highest rainfall recorded throughout the passage of the three systems combined. Meanwhile, a peak daily precipitation total of  fell in Asahimaru. Nation-wide, damage amounted to 21.9 billion yen (US$197 million). Thirteen people were killed by Ofelia.

Across Tokushima Prefecture, 44 homes and 487 roads were damaged while 25 other homes were destroyed. Monetary damage there was assessed at 9.82 billion yen. Three people were killed in a landslide near Mount Tsurugi. Across Kochi Prefecture, 142 homes were damaged and an additional 452 were destroyed. Moreover, 622 roads were damaged. Heavy rains contributed to flooding that overflowed rivers in Kochi, Kagami, and Yusuhara, destroying some homes. Throughout the prefecture, three people were killed and another was injured. Two homes were damaged in Kagawa Prefecture. Ofelia dropped heavy rains across Ehime Prefecture for a 36-hour period, resulting in 17 landslides. As a result of the rainfall, 11 trains were delayed and 16 flights were cancelled. Throughout the prefecture, 119 houses were damaged and 10 others were destroyed. Damage totaled 2.87 billion, which was primarily from crops. Four homes were damaged and one was destroyed in Miyazaki Prefecture. Heavy rains from Ofelia, Percy, and Nathan caused Nagasaki City to have their wettest July on record. Three homes were damaged and another was destroyed in Nagasaki Prefecture.

In Oita Prefecture, a landslide triggered by the rain crushed a home in Honyabakei, burying an 87-year old, 57-year-old and 10-year-old. All of the buried were found, two of whom had already perished and another later died in a hospital. Throughout the prefecture, six roads were damaged and there were twenty landslides. Due to a combination of Ofelia and Percy, two homes were damaged in Osaka Prefecture. Twelve homes were damaged in Hyogo Prefecture. Damage in Okayama Prefecture amounted to 789 million yen. Across Hiroshima Prefecture, 18,060 households lost power after 934 power lines were downed while 713 homes were damaged and 54 were destroyed. A total of 22 railtracks and 1,165 roads were damaged. Three people were wounded, including two after a home collapsed. Damage in the prefecture amounted to 8.11 billion yen. Six trains and some road traffic was halted in Yamaguchi Prefecture, located on the western tip of the Honshu. There, four people were killed, including a middle school student who drowned in floodwaters and a 49-year-old that was initially rendered missing, and eight others sustained injuries, three of whom in a tent in Tokuyama. Moreover, 1,312 homes were damaged and 84 others were destroyed; most of the damage and destroyed homes occurred in Ube. Across Shimane Prefecture, 230 homes were damaged and crop damage was estimated at 307 million yen. Due to a combination of Ofelia and Percy, eight homes were damaged in Hokkaido Prefecture.

See also
Tropical Storm Winona (1990)

Notes

References

O
O
O